Parexcelsa is a genus of moths in the family Geometridae described by Pearsall in 1912.

References
]

Geometridae